The following is a list of notable deaths in January 2011.

Entries for each day are listed alphabetically by surname. A typical entry lists information in the following sequence:
 Name, age, country of citizenship at birth, subsequent country of citizenship (if applicable), reason for notability, cause of death (if known), and reference.

January 2011

1
Anna Anni, 84, Italian costume designer (Otello).
Georgiy Ball, 83, Russian writer.
Branko Bokun, 90, Yugoslavian writer.
Peter Branson, 86, British admiral.
Sir Robin Carnegie, 84, British army general.
Charles Fambrough, 60, American jazz musician and composer.
Bruce Halliday, 84, Canadian physician and politician, MP for Oxford (1974–1993).
Gerd Michael Henneberg, 88, German actor.
Sonia Humphrey, 63, Australian television presenter and journalist.
Flemming Jørgensen, 63, Danish actor and musician (Bamses Venner), heart attack.
Verne Langdon, 69, American musician, record producer and make-up artist.
Constantin Marin, 85, Romanian musician, conductor and composer.
John Olguin, 89, American aquarium official, director of the Cabrillo Marine Aquarium (1949–1987).
Billy Joe Patton, 88, American golfer.
Louise Reiss, 90, American physician, co-ordinator of the Baby Tooth Survey.
John Rice, 92, American baseball umpire (1955–1973).
Faizal Yusof, 32, Malaysian actor, heart attack.

2
Bali Ram Bhagat, 88, Indian politician, Speaker of the Lok Sabha (1976–1977) and Governor of Rajasthan (1993–1998).
Kate Ebli, 52, American politician, member of the Michigan House of Representatives (2006–2010).
Anne Francis, 80, American actress (Honey West, Forbidden Planet, The Twilight Zone), pancreatic cancer.
Peter Hobbs, 92, French-born American character actor (Barney Miller, Lou Grant, The Odd Couple), after brief illness.
Hans Kalt, 86, Swiss rower, Olympic silver (1948) and bronze (1952) medalist.
Émile Masson Jr., 95, Belgian cyclist, winner of Paris–Roubaix and La Flèche Wallonne classic cycle races.
John Osborne, 74, Montserratian politician, Chief Minister (1978–1991; 2001–2006), after long illness.
Pete Postlethwaite, 64, British actor (In the Name of the Father, Inception, The Usual Suspects), pancreatic cancer.
William R. Ratchford, 76, American politician, U.S. Representative from Connecticut (1979–1985), complications from Parkinson's disease.
Bill Robertson, 93, Australian intelligence officer.
Miriam Seegar, 103, American silent film actress and interior designer.
Shen Tianhui, 87, Chinese chemist, academician of Chinese Academy of Sciences.
Patricia Smith, 80, American actress (The Spirit of St. Louis, The Bob Newhart Show, The Debbie Reynolds Show), heart failure.
Margot Stevenson, 98, American stage and radio actress (The Shadow).
Szeto Wah, 79, Hong Kong political activist, lung cancer.
Robert Trumble, 91, Australian writer and musician.
Hari Uppal, 84, Indian dancer and dance academy founder.
Richard Winters, 92, American army officer and World War II veteran, depicted in Band of Brothers, Parkinson's disease.

3
Julia Bonds, 58, American activist, cancer.
Fadil Hadžić, 88, Croatian filmmaker, screenwriter, playwright and journalist.
Jill Haworth, 65, English actress (Exodus, In Harm's Way, Cabaret, The Outer Limits), natural causes.
Zbigniew Jaremski, 61, Polish athlete, 1976 Olympic silver medalist.
Michael Kennelly, 96, Irish-born American Jesuit priest, President of Loyola University New Orleans (1970–1974), founder of Strake Jesuit College Prep.
Suchitra Mitra, 86, Indian singer, cardiac arrest.
Alfred Proksch, 102, Austrian athlete and graphic designer.
Yosef Shiloach, 69, Israeli actor, cancer.
Anatoliy Skorokhod, 81, Ukrainian mathematician.
Paul Soldner, 89, American ceramicist.
Eva Strittmatter, 80, German writer.
William Takaku, Papua New Guinean film and theatre actor, screenwriter and theatre director.
Stanley Tolliver, 85, American attorney and civil rights advocate.
Nakamura Tomijyuro V, 81, Japanese Kabuki actor, Living National Treasure.
Alec Woodall, 92, British politician, MP for Hemsworth (1974–1987).

4
Mohamed Bouazizi, 26, Tunisian protestor, self-immolation.
Grady Chapman, 81, American doo-wop singer (The Robins), heart failure.
Chrysanth Chepil, 73, Russian Orthodox prelate, Metropolitan of Vyatka-Slobodskoy.
B. H. Friedman, 84, American author and art critic, pneumonia.
Keki Byramjee Grant, 90, Indian cardiologist.
Sir John Gray, 92, British physiologist.
Cyril M. Harris, 93, American acoustical engineer.
Hadayatullah Hübsch, 64, German journalist.
Mick Karn, 52, Cypriot-born British musician (Japan), cancer.
Dick King-Smith, 88, British author (The Sheep-Pig, The Water Horse, The Queen's Nose).
Gustavo Kupinski, 36, Argentine guitarist (Los Piojos), car crash.
Coen Moulijn, 73, Dutch footballer, brain haemorrhage.
Ali-Reza Pahlavi, 44, Iranian royal, son of Shah Mohammed Reza Pahlavi, suicide by gunshot.
Ronald Parfitt, 97, British Olympic fencer.
Gerry Rafferty, 63, Scottish singer-songwriter ("Baker Street", "Stuck in the Middle with You", "Right Down the Line"), liver failure.
Jack Richardson, 90, British chemical engineer.
Salmaan Taseer, 66, Pakistani politician, Governor of Punjab (since 2008), shot.
Bob Usdane, 74, American politician, member of the Arizona Senate (1977–1991), after a short illness.

5
Jim Duncan, 86, American football player and coach.
Paul Egertson, 75, American Lutheran bishop, heart attack.
David Hart, 66, British political activist, author and playwright, motor neurone disease.
Lily Marinho, 89, Brazilian philanthropist, UNESCO Goodwill Ambassador, respiratory failure.
Malangatana Ngwenya, 74, Mozambican poet and painter, after long illness.
Jack Oliver, 87, American scientist, provided seismic evidence supporting plate tectonics.
Helene Palmer, 82, British actress (Coronation Street).
Agustin Perdices, 76, Filipino politician, Governor of Negros Oriental (since 2010), stomach cancer.
Assar Rönnlund, 75, Swedish cross-country skier, world and Olympic champion.
Brian Rust, 88, British jazz discographer and music journalist.
David G. Trager, 73, American jurist, pancreatic cancer.
Bill Zeller, 27, American computer programmer, injuries from a suicide attempt.

6
Leovigildo Banaag, 67, Filipino politician, cardiac arrest.
Rudi Bass, 96, Austrian-born American graphic artist, illustrator and writer.
John Bendor-Samuel, 81, British missionary and linguist, car accident.
Tom Cavanagh, 28, American ice hockey player (San Jose Sharks), blunt force trauma.
Susana Chávez, 36, Mexican poet and human rights activist, strangled.
Francisco de la Rosa, 44, Dominican baseball player (Baltimore Orioles), after a long illness.
Ryne Duren, 81, American baseball player (Philadelphia Phillies, New York Yankees).
Ohan Durian, 88, Armenian composer.
Gad Granach, 95, German memoirist, son of Alexander Granach.
John D. Kendall, 93, American musical educator (Suzuki method), complications of a stroke.
Irving Farmer Kennedy, 88, Canadian World War II fighter pilot.
Aron Kincaid, 70, American actor (The Ghost in the Invisible Bikini, Batman: the Animated Series, The Transformers), heart failure.
Gary Mason, 48, British boxer, cycling collision.
Uche Okafor, 43, Nigerian footballer, murdered.
Andrzej Przeździecki, 84, Polish Olympic fencer and trainer.
Anthony S. Seminerio, 75, American politician and convicted felon, member of the New York State Assembly (1979–2009).
Pyotr Sumin, 64, Russian politician, Governor of Chelyabinsk Oblast (1996–2010).
Donald J. Tyson, 80, American business executive, Chairman of Tyson Foods (1967–2001), cancer.
*Vang Pao, 81, Lao army general and Hmong community leader, Commander of the Secret Army, pneumonia.
Reg Ward, 82, British chief executive of London Docklands Development Corporation (1981–1987).
Dagmar Wilson, 94, American anti-nuclear activist, heart failure.

7
Helga Bachmann, 79, Icelandic actress and director.
Red Borom, 95, American baseball player (Detroit Tigers).
Eddie Carr, 87, American football player (San Francisco 49ers).
Carlos Castro, 65, Portuguese journalist, bludgeoned.
Derek Gardner, 79, British vehicle and Formula One car designer.
Robert P. Hanrahan, 76, American politician, U.S. Representative from Illinois (1973–1975).
George Harris, 77, American Olympic judoka, leukemia.
Bill "Tiger" Johnson, 84, American football player (San Francisco 49ers) and coach (Cincinnati Bengals).
Krzysztof Kolberger, 60, Polish actor, cancer.
Włodzimierz Ławniczak, 51, Polish journalist, Chairman of Telewizja Polska, after long illness.
Val Puccio, 45, American professional wrestler.
Richard Bordeaux Parker, 87, American diplomat.
Bobby Robinson, 93, American record producer.
Simona Senoner, 17, Italian ski jumper.
José Vidal, 70, Dominican baseball player (Cleveland Indians, Seattle Pilots), cancer.

8
Noel Andrews, 79, Irish boxing commentator.
Joey Carew, 73, Trinidadian cricketer (West Indies), arteriosclerosis.
Willi Dansgaard, 88, Danish paleoclimatologist.
Jiří Dienstbier, 73, Czech politician, Minister of Foreign Affairs (1989–1992).
Peter Donaldson, 58, Canadian actor (The Sweet Hereafter, Emily of New Moon, Road to Avonlea), lung cancer.
Hans Ulrich Engelmann, 89, German composer.
Mike Gambrill, 75, British Olympic cyclist, bronze medalist (1956).
José García, 84, Uruguayan footballer 
Oleg Grabar, 81, American Islamic art historian, heart failure.
Ángel Pedraza, 48, Spanish footballer and manager, cancer.
Manuel Pestana Filho, 82, Brazilian Roman Catholic prelate, Bishop of Anápolis (1978–2004).
*Juan Piquer Simón, 74, Spanish film director (Pieces, Slugs), lung cancer.
John Roll, 63, American jurist, shot.
Del Reisman, 86, American television producer (The Twilight Zone, The Untouchables) and writer, President of WGAW (1991–1993), cardiac arrest.
Elfa Secioria, 51, Indonesian jazz pianist.
Thorbjørn Svenssen, 86, Norwegian footballer, record 104 appearances for the national team, stroke.
Morton Sweig, 95, American businessman.
Christopher Trumbo, 70, American screenwriter, kidney cancer.
William F. Walsh, 98, American politician, Mayor of Syracuse, New York (1961–1969), Congressman (1973–1979).
Moshe Yess, 67, Canadian composer and singer, cancer.

9
James Acord, 66, American sculptor, suicide.
Vítor Alves, 75, Portuguese soldier and politician, member of the MFA, responsible for the Carnation Revolution, cancer.
Richard Butcher, 29, English footballer (Macclesfield Town), natural causes.
Ruth Cavin, 92, American mystery novel editor, lung cancer.
Debbie Friedman, 59, American songwriter, pneumonia.
Sir Ernest Lee-Steere, 98, Australian horse racing official, Lord Mayor of Perth, Western Australia (1972–1978).
Makinti Napanangka, 80s, Australian Papunya Tula artist.
Howard Wallace Pollock, 90, American politician, U.S. Representative from Alaska (1967–1971).
Dave Sisler, 79, American baseball player (Boston Red Sox, Cincinnati Reds), prostate cancer.
Georges Van Brabant, 84, Belgian Olympian 
Jerzy Woźniak, 78, Polish footballer (Legia Warszawa).
Peter Yates, 81, British film director and producer (Bullitt, Breaking Away, Krull).

10
Liana Alexandra, 63, Romanian music educator and composer.
Naseerullah Babar, 82, Pakistani soldier and politician, Governor of Khyber Pakhtunkhwa (1976–1977) and Interior Minister (1993–1996).
Arthur Barrett, 83, English footballer.
Bill Bower, 93, American aviator, last surviving pilot of Doolittle Raid, complications from a fall.
John Dye, 47, American actor (Touched by an Angel, Tour of Duty, Jack's Place), heart attack.
Dorothy Franey, 97, American Olympic speed skater.
Cookie Gilchrist, 75, American football player (Buffalo Bills, Denver Broncos), cancer.
Joe Gores, 79, American novelist and screenwriter.
John Gross, 75, British literary critic.
Miklós Hofer, 79, Hungarian architect.
Bert Kinnear, 87, British Olympic swimmer.
Bora Kostić, 80, Serbian footballer (Red Star Belgrade).
Shota Kviraia, 58, Georgian politician and security officer. 
Gideon Njoku, 63, Nigerian footballer and coach, cardiac arrest.
Vivek Shauq, 47, Indian actor, comedian, writer and singer, heart attack.
A. W. B. Simpson, 79, British legal historian.
María Elena Walsh, 80, Argentine musician, poet and writer ("Manuelita la tortuga"), after long illness.
John Ward, 90, American Roman Catholic prelate, Auxiliary Bishop of Los Angeles (1963–1996).
Gary Whitbread, 53, British cricketer.
Margaret Whiting, 86, American pop singer ("A Tree in the Meadow", "Moonlight in Vermont"), natural causes.

11
Zoltán Berczik, 73, Hungarian table tennis player and coach.
Ralph Campbell, 64, American politician, North Carolina state auditor (1992–2004), lung cancer.
Dame Barbara Clayton, 88, British pathologist.
Zoë Dominic, 90, English photographer.
Egon Drews, 84, German Olympic bronze medal-winning (1952) flatwater canoer.
Milan Ercegan, 94, Yugoslavian president of the International Federation of Associated Wrestling Styles (1972–2002).
Kozo Haraguchi, 100, Japanese track and field athlete, respiratory failure.
André Marchand, 84, Canadian politician, member of the Legislative Assembly of Quebec.
Matti Mattson, 94, American veteran of the Spanish Civil War (Abraham Lincoln Brigade).
John Modinos, 84, Cypriot opera baritone, heart failure.
David Nelson, 74, American actor (The Adventures of Ozzie and Harriet, Cry-Baby), colon cancer.
Knut Olsen, 57, Norwegian journalist and television presenter, cancer.
Alfio Peraboni, 56, Italian Olympic bronze medal-winning (1980, 1984) sailor, cerebral hemorrhage.
Won-il Rhee, 50, South Korean digital art curator, heart attack.
Ze'ev Segal, 63, Israeli jurist and legal analyst.
Marcel Trudel, 93, Canadian historian and author, cancer.

12
Aswismarmo, 85, Indonesian major general.
Clemar Bucci, 90, Argentine racing driver.
Hans Bütikofer, 95, Swiss Olympic silver medal-winning (1936) bobsledder. 
Howard Engleman, 91, American college basketball player.
Paul Picerni, 88, American actor (The Untouchables, The Young Marrieds, House of Wax), heart attack.
Terje Sagvolden, 65, Norwegian neuroscientist.
Kenneth Stevenson, 61, British Anglican prelate, Bishop of Portsmouth (1995–2009), cancer.
Dawn Sylvia-Stasiewicz, 52, American dog trainer (Bo) and author, respiratory distress.

13
Wali Khan Babar, 29, Pakistani journalist, gunshot.
Alan Butler, 80, South African priest.
Frank Calabro, 86, Italian-born Australian transport operator and politician, MLC (1970–1988).
Mick Cremin, 87, Australian rugby union footballer.
Tuviah Friedman, 88, Israeli Nazi hunter.
Michel Gratton, 58, Canadian journalist, Press Secretary to Prime Minister Brian Mulroney (1984–1987).
Albert Heijn Jr., 83, Dutch entrepreneur, owner of the Albert Heijn supermarket chain.
Greg Hjorth, Australian mathematician and chess player, heart attack.
Hellmut Lange, 87, German actor (Serenade for Two Spies, Diamond Safari).
Charles Muscat, 48, Maltese footballer.
Prabhakar Panshikar, 79, Indian stage actor, after long illness.
Allen Salter, 74, Canadian Olympic weightlifter.
Ellen Stewart, 91, American theater director.
Marian Woyna-Orlewicz, 97, Polish cross country skier.

14
Eduardo Armella, 82, Argentine Olympic shooter.
Sun Axelsson, 75, Swedish novelist.
Julio Barragán, 82, Argentine painter.
Salvatore Cancemi, 68, Italian mafiosi, stroke.
Georgia Carroll, 91, American fashion model and actress (Yankee Doodle Dandy).
David Coren, 93, Israeli politician, member of the Knesset (1969–1977).
Dr. Creep, 69, American television host.
Stephanie Glaser, 90, Swiss actress.
Marty Gold, 95, American composer, pianist and bandleader.
Toshiyuki Hosokawa, 70, Japanese actor, acute subdural hematoma.
*Liu Huaqing, 94, Chinese naval commander (1982–1988).
Peter Post, 77, Dutch cyclist, winner of the 1964 Paris–Roubaix event.
Betty Mae Tiger Jumper, 88, American health official and tribal leader, first woman to lead the Seminole tribe (1967–71).
Ben Wada, 80, Japanese television director, esophageal cancer.
Per Olav Wiken, 73, Norwegian Olympic silver medal-winning 1968 sailor.

15
Ellen Alaküla, 83, Estonian actress and theatre teacher.
Gaston Allaire, 94, Canadian musicologist.
Minhaj Barna, 89, Pakistani journalist.
Kenneth Grant, 86, British occultist and writer, head of the Typhonian Order.
Roy Hartsfield, 85, American baseball player (Boston Braves) and first manager of Toronto Blue Jays, complications of liver cancer.
Harvey James, 58, Australian musician (Sherbet), lung cancer.
Michael Langham, 91, English stage director and actor, complications from a chest infection.
Romulus Linney, 80, American playwright, lung cancer.
Nat Lofthouse, 85, English footballer (Bolton Wanderers, England).
Ed Lowe, 64, American journalist (Newsday, The Long Island Press), liver cancer.
Mike Vibert, 60, Jersey politician, Minister for Education, Sport and Culture (2005–2008), heart attack.
Susannah York, 72, English actress (Tom Jones, Superman, They Shoot Horses, Don't They?), bone marrow cancer.
Hilde Zach, 68, Austrian politician, Mayor of Innsbruck (2002–2010).
Zeng Xianyi, 74, Chinese professor of legal history.

16
Augusto Algueró, 76, Spanish composer and conductor, cardiac arrest.
Miguel Ángel Álvarez, 88, Puerto Rican comedian and actor, respiratory failure.
Julian Asquith, 2nd Earl of Oxford and Asquith, 94, British aristocrat and diplomat, Administrator of Saint Lucia (1958–1962), Governor of the Seychelles (1962–1967).
David Crowley, 72, American politician, cancer.
Hovhannes Bedros XVIII Kasparian, 83, Egyptian-born Lebanese Armenian Catholic prelate, Patriarch of Cilicia (1982–1998).
Milton Levine, 97, American entrepreneur, inventor of Uncle Milton's Ant Farm.
Steve Prestwich, 56, British-born Australian drummer (Cold Chisel, Little River Band) and songwriter, brain tumour.
Reinaldo Pünder, 72, German-born Brazilian Roman Catholic prelate, Bishop of Coroatá (since 1978).
Ye Peida, 95, Chinese telecommunications engineer, President of the Beijing Institute of Posts and Telecommunications.
Stefka Yordanova, 64, Bulgarian sprinter and middle-distance runner.

17
Marina Abroskina, 43, Russian basketball player, brain tumor.
Jürgen Barth, 67, German Olympic cyclist.
Brian Boobbyer, 82, English rugby union player and cricketer.
David Bradby, 68, British theatre scholar.
Sjonni Brink, 36, Icelandic musician and singer, complications from a stroke.
Sir Bernard Crossland, 87, British engineer, Pro-Vice-Chancellor of Queen's University Belfast (1978–1982).
Perry Currin, 82, American baseball player (St. Louis Browns), heart failure.
Keith Davey, 84, Canadian politician and campaign organizer, Senator (1966–1996).
Gita Dey, 79, Indian actress, cardiac arrest.
Jean Dutourd, 91, French novelist.
Vern Kaiser, 85, Canadian ice hockey player (Montreal Canadiens).
Don Kirshner, 76, American record producer and songwriter, host of Don Kirshner's Rock Concert, heart failure.
Robert W. Mackenzie, 82, Canadian labour organizer and politician, Ontario Minister of Labour (1990–1994).
John Ross, 72, American activist, author and journalist, liver cancer.
Shinichiro Sakurai, 81, Japanese automotive engineer, heart failure.

18
Charlie Cowdrey, 77, American football coach (Illinois State University, Southwestern College).
George Crowe, 89, American baseball player (St. Louis Cardinals).
Jerre DeNoble, 87, American baseball player (All-American Girls Professional Baseball League).
Eugenia Escudero, 96, Mexican Olympic fencer.
Al Grunwald, 80, American baseball player.
Duncan Hall, 85, Australian rugby league player.
John Herivel, 92, British codebreaker at Bletchley Park.
Antonín Kubálek, 75, Czech-born Canadian pianist, complications from a brain tumour.
Jim McManus, 70, American tennis player.
Cristian Paţurcă, 46, Romanian composer.
Milton Rogovin, 101, American documentary photographer.
Jacques Sarr, 76, Senegalese Roman Catholic prelate, Bishop of Thiès (since 1986).
Sargent Shriver, 95, American diplomat and politician, Ambassador to France (1968–1970), Vice Presidential nominee (1972), complications from Alzheimer's disease.
Edgar Tafel, 98, American architect.

19
John Barnes, 94, Australian cricketer.
Neva Egan, 96, American educator, First Lady of Alaska (1959–1966, 1970–1974), widow of William Allen Egan.
George Franck, 92, American football player (New York Giants).
Wayne R. Grisham, 88, American politician, Representative from California (1979–1983).
Mihai Ionescu, 74, Romanian footballer (Petrolul Ploieşti, Romania).
Jose Kusugak, 60, Canadian Inuit leader, bladder cancer.
James O'Gwynn, 82, American country music singer, pneumonia.
Bryce Postles, 79, New Zealand cricketer.
Ramiro Saraiva Guerreiro, 92, Brazilian politician, Minister of External Relations (1979–1985).
Bob Scott, 79, Australian politician, member of the Queensland Legislative Assembly for Cook (1977–1989).
Wilfrid Sheed, 80, English-born American novelist and essayist, urosepsis.
Carla Swart, 23, South African cyclist, traffic accident.
Hira Devi Waiba, 71, Nepali folk singer, injuries from a fire.
Bob Young, 87, American news journalist and anchor (ABC World News).

20
Kenth Andersson, 66, Swedish middle-distance runner.
Maurice Brown, 91, British Royal Air Force fighter pilot.
José Luis Castro Aguirre, 67, Mexican ichthyologist.
Eduardo Davino, 81, Italian Roman Catholic prelate, Bishop of Palestrina (1997–2005).
Bruce Gordon, 94, American actor (The Untouchables, Peyton Place, Piranha).
Ernest McCulloch, 84, Canadian biologist.
Miesque, 27, French racehorse, euthanized.
F. A. Nettelbeck, 60, American poet.
José Ortiz, 63, Puerto Rican baseball player.
Sonia Peres, 87, Israeli First Lady.
Reynolds Price, 77, American author, professor at Duke University, heart attack.
John Jacob Rhodes III, 67, American politician, U.S. Representative from Arizona (1987–1993).
Eugénio Salessu, 87, Angolan Roman Catholic prelate, Bishop of Malanje (1977–1998).
*Sexy Cora, 23, German pornographic actress, complications from breast enlargement surgery.
William Shipley, 89, American linguist, complications of pneumonia.
Alan Uglow, 69, British-born American painter, lung cancer.
Gus Zernial, 87, American baseball player (Oakland Athletics, Detroit Tigers, Chicago White Sox), heart failure.

21
Theoni V. Aldredge, 88, Greek-born American costume designer (Ghostbusters, Network, The Great Gatsby), Oscar winner (1975).
Robert Cohu, 99, French Olympic basketball player.
Peter Demos, 87, Australian Olympic basketball player.
Jay Garner, 82, American actor (Pennies from Heaven, Buck Rogers in the 25th Century), respiratory failure.
Tony Geiss, 86, American television writer and composer (Sesame Street), Emmy award winner, complications from a fall.
Emanuele Gerada, 90, Maltese Roman Catholic prelate, Titular Archbishop of Nomentum, Apostolic Nuncio to Ireland (1989–1995).
Herb Gray, 76, American-born Canadian football player (Winnipeg Blue Bombers).
Barney F. Hajiro, 94, American soldier, formerly the oldest living Medal of Honor recipient.
Wally Hughes, 76, English football coach.
Dennis Oppenheim, 72, American artist, liver cancer.
E. V. V. Satyanarayana, 54, Indian Telugu movie director, throat cancer and cardiac arrest.

22
Virgil Akins, 82, American boxer, world welterweight champion (1958).
Solange Bertrand, 97, French artist.
Sir Chandos Blair, 91, British army general.
Ralph Felton, 78, American football player (Washington Redskins).
Aslam Khokhar, 91, Pakistani cricketer.
Quentin Orlando, 91, American politician, Member of the Pennsylvania State Senate (1973–1980).
Park Wan-suh, 79, South Korean novelist, cancer.
René Piché, 79, Canadian politician.
Bobby Poe, 77, American pop singer, songwriter and promoter, blood clot.
Gary Schreider, 76, Canadian football player.
William Schreyer, 83, American business executive, chairman and CEO of Merrill Lynch (1985–1993).
Lois Smith, 81, Canadian dancer (National Ballet of Canada).
Tullia Zevi, 91, Italian journalist and politician, leader of the Italian Jewish community.

23
Danny Brabham, 69, American football player (Houston Oilers, Cincinnati Bengals).
Ed Dyas, 71, American football player (Auburn Tigers), member of the College Football Hall of Fame, stomach cancer.
Peter Gibb, 56, Australian criminal, heart attack.
Ole Kopreitan, 73, Norwegian political activist.
Jack LaLanne, 96, American fitness and nutritional expert, pneumonia.
Poppa Neutrino, 77, American adventurer, crossed Atlantic Ocean on raft made of discarded material, heart failure.
Louise Raggio, 91, American lawyer.
Novica Tadić, 62, Yugoslavian poet.
Neil Truscott, 88, Australian diplomat.

24
Alec Boden, 85, Scottish footballer (Celtic).
Bernd Eichinger, 61, German film producer (The NeverEnding Story, Resident Evil, Fantastic Four), heart attack.
David Frye, 77, American satirist and Richard Nixon impersonator, cardiopulmonary arrest.
Phil Gallie, 71, British politician, MP for Ayr (1992–97), MSP for South of Scotland (1999–2007).
Barrie Lee Hall, Jr., 61, American jazz trumpeter and band leader (Duke Ellington).
Basil F. Heath, 93, Canadian-born American Mohawk actor and stuntman.
Bhimsen Joshi, 88, Indian musician, Bharat Ratna laureate.
Francisco Mata, 78, Venezuelan folk singer and composer.
Jack Matheson, 86, Canadian sports journalist.
Samuel Ruiz, 86, Mexican Roman Catholic prelate, Bishop of San Cristóbal de las Casas (1959–2000).
Anna Yablonskaya, 29, Ukrainian playwright, bombing.

25
Daniel Bell, 91, American sociologist.
Vincent Cronin, 86, British writer.
Alison Geissler, 103, British glass engraver.
Bill Holden, 82, English footballer.
Arto Javanainen, 51, Finnish ice hockey player (Pittsburgh Penguins), after long illness.
Kotha Satchidananda Murthy, 86, Indian philosopher.
Ganga Bahadur Thapa, 75–76, Nepalese Olympic runner.

26
Anna Avanzini, 93, Italian Olympic gymnast.
Robert Crook, 81, American politician, member of the Mississippi State Senate (1964–1992).
Mike DeBardeleben, 70, American criminal, pneumonia.
John Herbert, 81, Brazilian actor, emphysema.
Gladys Horton, 65, American R&B singer (The Marvelettes), complications from a stroke.
David Kato, 46, Ugandan gay rights activist, bludgeoned with hammer.
R. F. Langley, 72, British poet and diarist.
Charlie Louvin, 83, American country music singer (The Louvin Brothers), pancreatic cancer.
María Mercader, 92, Spanish actress.
Eddie Mordue, 83, British saxophonist.
Tore Sjöstrand, 89, Swedish Olympic gold medal-winning (1948) athlete.

27
Charlie Callas, 86, American comedian and actor (Pete's Dragon, Silent Movie, Switch).
Liana Dumitrescu, 38, Romanian politician, member of the Chamber of Deputies (since 2004), stroke.
William L. Eagleton, 84, American diplomat.
Mārtiņš Freimanis, 33, Latvian musician (F.L.Y.) and actor, performed at Eurovision Song Contest 2003, influenza.
Henri Goosen, 84, French Olympic diver.
Hannemor Gram, 92, Norwegian Olympic alpine skier. 
Boyd Kirkland, 60, American animation producer and director (Batman: The Animated Series, X-Men: Evolution, G.I. Joe: A Real American Hero), pulmonary fibrosis.
Wenceslau Malta, 79, Brazilian Olympic modern pentathlete.
Vaughn Mancha, 89, American football player (Boston Yanks), heart failure.
Svein Mathisen, 58, Norwegian footballer (IK Start), cancer.
Butch McCord, 85, American Negro league baseball player.
Diana Norman, 77, British author and journalist.
Don Rondo, 81, American singer ("White Silver Sands"), lung cancer.
Tøger Seidenfaden, 53, Danish newspaper editor-in-chief (Politiken), cancer.
Guy J. Velella, 66, American politician and convicted criminal, New York State Assemblyman (1973–1982) and State Senator (1986–2004), lung cancer.
Kjeld Vibe, 83, Norwegian diplomat, ambassador to the United States.
William Williams, 83, Canadian metallurgical engineer.

28
Hamida Barmaki, 40, Afghan law professor and human rights activist, suicide bomb attack.
William Bartley, 94, American pilot.
Ken Carpenter, 84, American football player (Cleveland Browns).
Raymond Cohen, 91, British violinist.
Karen Cromie, 31, British Paralympian, suicide.
Sushil Kumar Dhara, 99, Indian revolutionary.
Dariush Homayoon, 82, Iranian politician and journalist, Minister of Information and Tourism (1977–1978).
Megan McNeil, 20, Canadian singer, adrenal cancer.
Dame Margaret Price, 69, British soprano, heart failure.

29
Ian Abdulla, 63–64, Australian artist, cancer.
Hussein El-Alfy, 83, Egyptian rower.
Milton Babbitt, 94, American composer.
Zahra Bahrami, 46, Dutch-Iranian protestor and convicted drug trafficker, execution by hanging.
William J. Bate, 76, American politician.
José Llopis Corona, 92, Spanish footballer.
Bruce Jackson, 62, American audio engineer, plane crash.
Loreen Rice Lucas, 96, Canadian author.
Hemayel Martina, 20, Curaçaon poet, complications of car accident.
Raymond McClean, 78, Northern Irish politician and doctor, Mayor of Derry (1973–1974).
Emilio Ogñénovich, 88, Argentine Roman Catholic prelate, Archbishop of Mercedes-Luján (1982–2000).
Nora Sun, 72, Chinese-born American diplomat, businesswoman and author, granddaughter of Sun Yat-sen, injuries from car crash.
Dorothy Thompson, 87, British social historian.
Emanuel Vardi, 95, Israeli-born American violist, cancer.
Liza Vorfi, 86, Albanian stage actress, after long illness.
Norman Wilkinson, 79, English football player.

30
Brian Barritt, 76, English author, artist, and counterculture figure.
John Barry, 77, British film score composer (From Russia with Love, Chaplin, Out of Africa), five-time Oscar winner, heart attack.
Ajahn Maha Bua, 97, Thai Buddhist monk.
J. Elliott Burch, 86, American hall of fame racehorse trainer, pneumonia.
Michael Herzog, 58, Austrian ice hockey player.
Charles Nolan, 53, American fashion designer, cancer of the head and neck.
Bernard O'Brien, 96, American politician, member of the Pennsylvania House of Representatives (1965–1980).
Ian R. Porteous, 80, British mathematician.
Hisaye Yamamoto, 89, American author.

31
Hernán Alvarado Solano, 65, Colombian Roman Catholic prelate, Vicar Apostolic of Guapi (since 2001).
Bartolomeu Anania, 89, Romanian Orthodox Metropolitan of Cluj-Napoca, Alba Iulia, Crişana and Maramureş (since 1993).
A. C. Bartulis, 83, American businessman and politician.
Raymond Challinor, 81, British historian.
Nikolay Dorizo, 87, Russian poet.
Zilpha Grant, 91, British Olympic swimmer.
Stuart Hood, 95, Scottish writer and television executive, controller of BBC Television (1961–1964).
Charles Kaman, 91, American aeronautical engineer, founder of Kaman Aircraft and Ovation Guitar Company.
Tally Monastyryov, 71, Soviet Olympic skier.
Nildo Parente, 76–77, Brazilian actor, stroke.
Mark Ryan, 51, British musician (Adam and the Ants), complications from liver damage.
Charles Sellier, 67, American film and television producer (The Life and Times of Grizzly Adams).
N. Khelchandra Singh, 90, Indian writer, lexicographer and historian.
Michael Tolan, 85, American actor (The Greatest Story Ever Told, The Mary Tyler Moore Show), heart disease and renal failure.
Norman Uprichard, 82, Northern Irish footballer.
Doc Williams, 96, American country music performer.

References

2011-01
 01